Costa may refer to:

Biology
 Rib (Latin: costa), in vertebrate anatomy
 Costa (botany), the central strand of a plant leaf or thallus
 Costa (coral), a stony rib, part of the skeleton of a coral
 Costa (entomology), the leading edge of the forewing of winged insects, as well as a part of the male clasper

Arts and entertainment
 Costa!, a 2001 Dutch film
 Costa!!, a 2022 Dutch film
 Costa Book Awards, formerly the Whitbread Book Award, a literary award in the UK

Organisations
 Costa Caribe, a Nicaraguan basketball team
 Costa Coffee, a British coffee shop chain, sponsor of the book award
 Costa Cruises, a leading cruise company in Europe
 Costa Del Mar, an American manufacturer of polarized sunglasses
 Costa Group, Australian food supplier

Places
 Costa, Haute-Corse, France, a commune on the island of Corsica
 Costa, Lajas, Puerto Rico, a barrio
 Costa, West Virginia, US, or Brushton, a community
 Costa Head, a headland on the Orkney Islands

People
 Costa (surname), including origin of the name and people sharing the surname
 Costa (footballer) (born 1973), Portuguese football manager and former player
 Costa-Gavras (born 1933), Greek-French filmmaker

See also
 
 Costal (disambiguation)
 Costas, a name of Greek origin